Parliamentary elections were held in Estonia between 27 and 29 November 1920, the first held under the 1920 constitution. 100 deputies were elected into the new Riigikogu by party lists in 10 regions, by which one party or electoral bloc could put up several lists in one region. Seats were still distributed on the state level, where votes for different lists were summed up by their political affiliation and then seats distributed using d'Hondt formula. Thereafter seats for one party or bloc were distributed between different lists of that political force using the same formula.

Results

See also
I Riigikogu

References

II Riigikogu valimised : 5.-7. mail 1923 / Riigi Statistika Keskbüroo = Élections au parlement : de 5.-7. mai 1923 / Bureau Central de Statistique de l'Estonie - Tallinn : Riigi Statistika Keskbüroo, 1923 (Tallinn : Tallinna Eesti Kirjastus-Ühisus ; Narva : M. Minis)

Parliamentary elections in Estonia
Estonia
1920 in Estonia
November 1920 events
Election and referendum articles with incomplete results